The Sower Reaps is a 1914 American silent short drama film directed by Thomas Ricketts, starring William Garwood, Harry von Meter, and Vivian Rich.

Cast
 William Garwood as Ben Rolfe
 Harry von Meter as Mr. Pike
 Vivian Rich as Laurel Pike, his daughter
 Reaves Eason as Tim Rolfe
 Jack Richardson as Peter Pelham
 Louise Lester as His wife
 Perry Banks as Crane
 Chick Morrison as Police official
 Harry Edmondson as The Sheriff

External links

1914 films
1914 drama films
Silent American drama films
American silent short films
American black-and-white films
1914 short films
1910s American films